Neeraj Khemlani is a Singaporean-born American serving as the co-president of CBS News and CBS Television Stations.

Early life 
Khemlani was born in Singapore with Indian ancestry and was raised in New York City. He graduated with an undergraduate degree from Cornell University in 1992 and a master's degree in journalism from Columbia University.

Career 
Khemlani was an associate producer for ABC News anchorman Peter Jennings and produced pieces with Robert Krulwich for the Nightline and Good Morning America. He joined CBS News in 1998 as a producer for the 60 Minutes television news magazine, where he was responsible for researching, reporting and writing stories with various CBS News correspondents. He was a senior executive at Yahoo! News from 2006 to 2009. He joined the Hearst Corporation as a vice president in 2009. On April 15, 2021, Khemlani and Wendy McMahon were named as co-heads of CBS News and CBS TV Stations, succeeding Peter Dunn and Susan Zirinsky.

Personal life 
He is married to Heather Cabot, an anchor and correspondent for ABC News. He is a term member of the Council on Foreign Relations in New York.

Awards 

 1995 DuPont Award for participation in ABC News’ coverage of the war in Bosnia
 2002 Edward R. Murrow award for best investigative reporting
 2003 Emmy nomination for Best Interview
 2004 Emmy nomination for business reporting
 2006 Emmy nomination for Outstanding Feature Story in a News Magazine

See also 
 Indians in the New York City metropolitan region
 New Yorkers in journalism

References 

American people of Sindhi descent
Singaporean emigrants to the United States
American people of Indian descent
American people of Singaporean descent
Columbia University Graduate School of Journalism alumni
American Hindus
Cornell University alumni
Living people
Sindhi people
Year of birth missing (living people)
Presidents of CBS News
60 Minutes producers